ÿ is a Latin script character composed of the letter Y and the diaeresis diacritical mark. It occurs in a few Hungarian names as well, such as Lajos Méhelÿ and Margit Danÿ.

As  rarely appears as the first letter in a name, and all-caps text typically omitted all accents, initially there was assumed to be no need for an uppercase  when computer character sets such as CP437 and ISO 8859-1 were designed. However much software assumes that conversion from lower-case to upper-case and then back again is lossless, so  was added to many character sets such as CP1252, ISO 8859-15, and Unicode (in which every pre-composed Latin character has both an upper- and lower-case version). This also happened to a more prominent character, the German ß.

IPA uses [ÿ] as one of the Closed central compressed vowels, a type of vowel sound used in some spoken languages.

In Unicode
 
 

Letters with diaeresis
Latin letters with diacritics
Phonetic transcription symbols